Movies (and Other Things): A Collection of Questions Asked, Answered, Illustrated, written by Shea Serrano and illustrated by Arturo Torres, was published in October 2019. It became the duo’s third consecutive number-one bestseller on The New York Times best-seller list.

Publication history
Movies (and Other Things) is Shea Serrano and Arturo Torres’s third book together.  It was published by Twelve, an imprint of Grand Central at Hachette.

Content
The 256-page book has 30 chapters on different movies. Each is illustrated by Torres and each poses a question to be answered in the essay. 

Actor John Leguizamo contributed a preface and Don Cheadle wrote an afterword.

Reception
In the Los Angeles Times, Jen Yamato wrote, "Each essay turns the pop culture whiz's voracious appetite for movies of the last several decades into jumping-off points for wider cultural conversations and curiosities." In Esquire, Jack Holmes called it “a charming examination of industry tropes and his personal hobby-horses across all the movies he's watched—sometimes many times—since the '80s."

References

2019 non-fiction books
Books about film
Essay collections
Twelve (publisher) books